The Fightin' Redhead is a 1928 American silent Western film directed by Louis King and starring Buzz Barton, Duane Thompson and Milburn Morante.

Cast
 Buzz Barton as Red Hepner 
 Duane Thompson as Jane Anderson 
 Milburn Morante as Sidewinder Steve 
 Bob Fleming as Bob Anderson 
 Edmund Cobb as Tom Reynolds 
 Edward Hearn as Jim Dalton

References

External links
 

1928 films
1928 Western (genre) films
American black-and-white films
Films directed by Louis King
Film Booking Offices of America films
Silent American Western (genre) films
1920s English-language films
1920s American films